Darreh Ziarat-e Sofla (also Romanized as Darreh Zīārat-e Soflá and Darreh-ye Zīārat-e Soflá; also known as Darreh-ye Zīārat-e Pā’īn, Darreh Zeyārat-e Pā’īn, Darreh Zīārat-e Pā’īn, and Darreh Zīyārat) is a village in Zu ol Faqr Rural District, Sarshiv District, Saqqez County, Kurdistan Province, Iran. At the 2006 census, its population was 227, in 41 families. The village is populated by Kurds.

References 

Towns and villages in Saqqez County
Kurdish settlements in Kurdistan Province